Hadrohybus is an extinct genus of trilobites in the order Phacopida. It lived in Newfoundland during the Ordovician.

References

External links 
 Hadrohybus at the Paleobiology Database

Phacopida genera
Ordovician trilobites of North America